Dursadaf Karimova (born 23 August 1985) is a visually impaired Azerbaijani Paralympic judoka. She won the gold medal in the women's +70 kg event at the 2020 Summer Paralympics held in Tokyo, Japan.

Personal life
Dursadaf is the sister of Azerbaijani judoka, paralympic gold medalists Khanim Huseynova.

References

External links

 
 

1985 births
Living people
Azerbaijani female judoka
Judoka at the 2020 Summer Paralympics
Medalists at the 2020 Summer Paralympics
Paralympic judoka of Azerbaijan
Paralympic medalists in judo
Paralympic gold medalists for Azerbaijan
20th-century Azerbaijani women
21st-century Azerbaijani women